Show Gate is a New Zealand Racing Hall of Fame champion thoroughbred racehorse sired by Gatekeeper out of Minglow, a Eulogy mare.

Foaled in 1969, she was horse of the year in 1975 and 1977 and won races from 1200 metres up to 2400 metres in record time. She started in 51 races, winning 30, and was second 7 times, third twice and unplaced in 12 races.

Show Gate was owned, bred and trained by Gordon Thomson of Mosgiel, Dunedin.

Racing career

A mare with an ability to carry big weights over all distances in record times, legendary New Zealand jockey Bob Skelton was quoted to say "She's A Machine" and the "Equal of modern day Hall of Fame mare Sunline"

She won the Stewards, Canterbury Gold Cup and the Churchill Stakes over 1200m, 2000m and 1600m respectively over 7 days at the Canterbury Show week meetings at Riccarton Park. She went on to capture all three twice during her career.

Show Gate suffered a fractured sesamoid bone in the spring of 1974 after winning her first five races as a five-year-old.

She returned to racing as a seven-year-old, winning 7 of her 13 starts, and ran a very unlucky second to Good Lord in the 1977 Wellington Cup over 3200m. Two days later she broke the NZ record over 2400m, 2:26.1 with the top weight of 57 kg on three legs, as she had again gone amiss 1000m from home, her last race. Many fine judges have Show Gate as one of the best mares ever to race in New Zealand.

Notable races

These include:
 April 1973 - 1st in the Great Easter Handicap (1400m, Riccarton)
 November 1973 - 1st in the Stewards Handicap (1200m, Riccarton) beating Shardia and Kalmia
 November 1973 - 1st in the Churchill Stakes (1600m, Riccarton) beating Zarnia and Kaukapakapa
 January 1974 - 1st in the Telegraph Handicap (1200m) beating Sharif and That’s Luck
 March 1974 - 1st in the North Island Challenge Stakes (1400m) beating Count Kereru and Dee Light
 March 1974 - 2nd in the Port Nicholson Stakes (2000m WFA) behind Fury's Order
 April 1974 - 1st in the Awapuni Gold Cup (2000m) beating Jackaroo and Sweet Offer
 9 November 1974 - 1st in the Stewards Handicap beating Soliloquy and Paratonnerre
 13 November 1974 - 1st in the Canterbury Gold Cup (2000m) beating Sobeit and Guest Star
 16 November 1974 - 1st in the Churchill Stakes beating Auditor and Harrisand

After the Churchill Stakes in November 1974 Show Gate did not race again until August 1976 due to a cracked sesamoid bone.

 18 September 1976 - unplaced in the Theo Marks Quality Handicap (Sydney) won by Ease The Squeeze. This was Show Gate's only Australian race.
 November 1976 - 2nd in the Stewards Handicap behind Grey Way with The Swagger 3rd
 November 1976 - 1st in the Canterbury Gold Cup beating Silver Lad and Mayo Mellay
 December 1976 - 2nd in the Avondale Cup (2200m)
 December 1976 - 1st in the Dunedin Gold Cup (2400m)
 December 1976 - 1st in the Timaru Gold Cup (1600m)
 January 1977 - 2nd in the Wellington Cup (3200m) behind Good Lord with Our Countess 3rd
 January 1977 - 1st in the Trentham Stakes (2400m)

Breeding and progeny

Show Gate only produced three foals.  Two were colts by Honey Crepe (GB): Sporting Show and Every Show. Later a filly, Show Queen by Balmerino.

Sporting Show won 10 races from 56 starts while Every Show won 11 races from 26 starts.  Both raced in the South Island and later served as sires.

Show Queen produced a daughter Showella (by Lord Ballina) who won six races. Her wins included the Group One 2000 New Zealand Stakes and the Group One 1999 South Australian Derby, as well as being group one placed twice. She was the Champion Older horse in New Zealand in 1999-2000.

Showella's first foal Safwa, a filly by Danehill, was sold to Sheikh Mohammed Bin Khalifa Al Maktoumm for $800,000 and went on to win five races in Australia.  This included two listed races, the 2007 Japan Racing Association Plate (2000m, Randwick) and the 2007 De Bortoli Wines Epona Stakes (1900m, Rosehill).

Show Gate's great-grandson, Showcause (Giant’s Causeway – Showella) was runner up in the Group One 2011 Auckland Cup and won the Group One 2011 Avondale Cup as well as the City of Auckland Cup (Group 2) and 2010 New Zealand Cup (Group 3).  He was the champion stayer in New Zealand 2010-11. In Australia he was placed 4th in the 2011 Geelong Cup behind Dunaden and 3rd in the 2011 The Bart Cummings behind Mourayan.

See also

 Thoroughbred racing in New Zealand
 Grey Way winning the 1976 Awapuni Gold Cup

References

1969 racehorse births
Racehorses bred in New Zealand
Racehorses trained in New Zealand
Thoroughbred family 22-b